Bushkan District is in Dashtestan County, Bushehr province, Iran. At the 2006 census, its population was 12,242 in 2,721 households. The following census in 2011 counted 11,915 people in 3,109 households. At the latest census in 2016, the district had 12,943 inhabitants living in 3,776 households.

References 

Districts of Bushehr Province
Populated places in Dashtestan County